In the United States, vehicle safety inspection and emissions inspection are governed by each state individually. Fifteen states have a periodic (annual or biennial) safety inspection program, while Maryland  requires a safety inspection and Alabama requires a VIN inspection on sale or transfer of vehicles which were previously registered in another state.  An additional 16 states require periodic emissions inspections.

In 1977, the federal Clean Air Act was amended by Congress to require states to implement vehicle emissions inspection programs, known as I/M programs (for Inspection and Maintenance), in all major metropolitan areas whose air quality failed to meet certain federal standards. New York's program started in 1982, California's program (Smog Check) started in 1984, and Illinois's program started in 1986. The Clean Air Act of 1990 required some states to enact vehicle emissions inspection programs. States impacted were those in metropolitan areas where air quality did not meet federal standards.  Some states, including Kentucky and Minnesota, have discontinued their testing programs in recent years with approval from the federal government.

List of jurisdictions

Require periodic vehicle safety inspections 

 Connecticut – not for passenger vehicles, but annually for certain commercial vehicles, trucks, grey market, salvage, and several types of trailers.
 Delaware – annually or biennially, new cars are exempt from inspection for the first seven years provided the car remains with the same owner.
 District of Columbia—biennially for publicly owned vehicles only, the requirement for safety inspection for privately owned cars ended October 1, 2009.
 Hawaii – annually, with the following exceptions: Brand new vehicles receive an inspection valid for two years.  Emergency vehicles, school vehicles, rental cars, and vehicles used in public transportation must be inspected every six months. Sticker placed on rear bumper to right on license plate.
 Louisiana – annually. However, as of September 2012, people in most jurisdictions have the option of getting a sticker good for two years, rather than one, by paying double the usual fee. In most of south Louisiana, inspection stickers are commonly referred to as "Brake Tags"; they are placed on the inside of the windshield, in the lower left corner of the windshield (on the driver's side). Colors change every year.
 Maine – annually. Color of sticker changes annually.  School buses are inspected every six months.  Vehicles registered as Antique Autos are exempt. Sticker placed in top center of windshield behind rear view mirror or lower left-hand corner of windshield.
Maryland – when registering vehicles from another state. When a used vehicle is purchased.
Massachusetts – annually. Stickers are placed in the lower right corner of the windshield.
 Missouri – biennially, based on the vehicle's model year.  Odd-numbered model year renews in odd-numbered year, even-numbered model year renews in even-numbered year. Effective August 28, 2019, motor vehicles for the first ten years following the model year of manufacture and having less than 150,000 miles on the odometer are exempt from the safety inspection requirement.  Vehicles displaying historical plates are completely exempt from inspection.
 New Hampshire – annually, except the first inspection of a new vehicle or upon an ownership transfer is adjusted to expire in the month of the registrant's birthday and is therefore valid for 4 to 15 months. Sticker placed in lower driver corner of the windshield.
 New Jersey – annually for commercial vehicles (including taxis, limousines, jitneys, and buses), effective January 1, 2010.  Passenger vehicles are exempt from safety inspections, effective August 1, 2010.
 New York – annually. Color of sticker changes annually. Newly registered vehicles with a current inspection sticker from another state are exempt until the out-of-state sticker expires or for one year after registration in New York, whichever is sooner. Vehicles registered as farm vehicles are exempt. Stickers are placed on the lower left corner of windshield.
 North Carolina – annually until the vehicle is 30 years of age, at which point inspections are no longer required.
 Pennsylvania – annually for most vehicles; every six months for school vehicles (including school buses and school vans), motor coaches, mass transit buses, etc. Stickers are placed on the lower driver's side corner of the windshield. Vehicles bearing antique vehicle license plates are exempt from inspection, but vehicles bearing classic or collectible license plates are subject to inspection.  Trailers in excess of  GVW are also inspected annually as are motorcycles.
 Rhode Island – biennially; newly registered vehicles are exempt from the inspection requirement for two years from the date of purchase. Vehicles registered as antiques are subject to safety inspection, but are exempt from emissions testing. Stickers are placed on lower-right corner of windshield.
 Texas – new vehicles are sold with an inspection decal which expires two years after the sale of the vehicle.  Annually thereafter and for Motorcycles.  The inspection decal is placed in the lower left corner of the windshield near the registration decal.  As of March 1, 2015, the inspection decal was eliminated and proof of inspection will be required to renew the registration. Any vehicle registered as antique 25 years or older does not need safety inspection.
 Vermont – annually; inspections are due at the end of even-numbered months only.  Inspections performed in an odd-numbered month will receive a sticker for the next even-numbered month (e.g., a car inspected in November 2011 will receive a sticker good until December 31, 2012). Inspection stickers are placed behind the rearview mirror and are color-coded by year.
 Virginia – annually. Newly registered vehicles with a valid inspection from another state are not exempt from inspection until the out-of-state inspection expires. As soon as a vehicle is registered in Virginia, that vehicle must have a Virginia safety inspection.  Primarily yellow; background color of year digits changes annually.  Placed in the lower left part of the windshield (lower center windshield before January 1, 2018). Beginning January 2019 the color of Virginia's inspection stickers changed from yellow to blue.
 West Virginia – annually; color of sticker changes annually; sticker placed in lower left corner of windshield.

Require inspection only prior to sale or transfer of ownership 
 Alabama VIN only 
 Maryland safety

Require safety inspection only when bringing vehicle from another jurisdiction 
 Nebraska
 Kentucky

Require periodic vehicle emissions inspections 

 Arizona – biennially, in Phoenix and Tucson metro areas only, depending on age and type of vehicle.
 California – biennially for all vehicles from out-of-state, regardless of age; and all vehicles made after 1975 which are more than six years old in all or some zip codes in 41 out of 58 counties.
 Colorado – biennially, except for vehicles seven years old and newer. Required in Boulder, Broomfield, Denver, Douglas, and Jefferson Counties, and parts of Adams, Arapahoe, Larimer, and Weld Counties.
 Connecticut – biennially.
 Delaware – annually or biennially.  Older cars registered as antiques are exempt from emissions testing.
 District of Columbia – biennially.
 Georgia – annually for gasoline-powered cars or light-duty trucks (8,500 pounds GVWR or less), required only in the 13 metro Atlanta counties (Cherokee, Clayton, Cobb, Coweta, DeKalb, Douglas, Fayette, Forsyth, Fulton, Gwinnett, Henry, Paulding and Rockdale). The three most recent model year vehicles and those that are 25 model years or older are exempt from emissions testing, as well as all motorcycles, recreational vehicles (RVs), motor homes and diesel-powered vehicles.
 Idaho – required in Ada County and Canyon County only.
 Illinois – biennially after the vehicle is four years old.  Required only in the Chicago metropolitan area and eastern suburbs of St. Louis, Missouri.
 Indiana – biennially, required in Lake County and Porter County (Chicago metropolitan area)/Northwest Indiana only.
 Louisiana – annually, only in the Baton Rouge metropolitan area parishes of Ascension, East Baton Rouge, Iberville, Livingston, and West Baton Rouge. Cars registered in these five parishes must be inspected in one of the five parishes; cars from outside those parishes (excluding the cities of New Orleans, Kenner and Westwego) may be inspected in the Baton Rouge area. 
 Maine – annually, only in Cumberland County. Also required by ordinance in Sanford, Maine but unenforced as many go to other towns to get inspected car and police cannot arrest or decline registration or inspection of Sanford car as its not mentioned in state law .
 Maryland – biennially, required in 13 (out of 23) counties and the independent city of Baltimore.  The most recent two model years of vehicles are exempt from emissions testing.
 Massachusetts – annually, as of 2008. Vehicles less than 15 years old must pass an OBD-2 scan for emissions system compliance. Vehicles over 15 years old receive a visual check and must not 'produce visible smoke'. Prior to 2008, an emissions inspection was required biennially based on the vehicle's model year (odd-numbered model years were inspected in odd-numbered years, even-numbered model years were inspected in even-numbered years).  Also in 2008, the tailpipe test for 1995 model year and older vehicles was discontinued.
 Missouri – biennially, based on the vehicle's model year, required only in St. Louis City, St. Louis County, St. Charles County, Franklin County, and Jefferson County.
 Nevada – required only in the urban areas of Clark County (Las Vegas) and Washoe County (Reno) for most vehicles. New vehicles in their first or second years of registration, hybrid vehicles five model years old or less, diesel vehicles with a gross vehicle weight of 14,000 lb. or more, 1967 or older vehicles, motorcycles/mopeds, and certain other vehicles are exempt.
 New Hampshire – annually, except the first inspection of a new vehicle or upon an ownership transfer is adjusted to expire in the month of the registrant's birthday and is therefore valid for 4 to 15 months.  Emissions inspection is required only for model year 1996 and newer vehicles that are less than 20 years old.
 New Jersey – biennially. Effective January 1, 2010, commercial vehicles (including taxis, limousines, jitneys, and buses) are subject to an annual inspection. Effective August 1, 2010, new non-commercial vehicles are exempt for the first five years. Used non-commercial vehicles are also exempt for the first five model years, as indicated on the New Car Dealer inspection decal. Used non-commercial vehicles originally purchased outside of New Jersey will receive a decal valid for five years from the model year of the vehicle. Effective May 2016, cars 1995 and older are no longer subject to emissions inspection.
 New Mexico – biennially, required only for vehicles 1983 and newer registered in, or commuting to Bernalillo County (which includes the state's largest city of Albuquerque).
 New York – annually. Newly registered vehicles with a current inspection sticker from another state are exempt until the out-of-state sticker expires or for one year after registration in New York, whichever is sooner.  Model year 1996 and newer vehicles are subject to an OBD-II emissions inspection, while older cars receive a visual check of emissions components. Until December 31, 2010, vehicles registered in the five boroughs of New York City, as well as on Long Island, in Westchester County or in Rockland County required a tailpipe smog-test if they are not OBD II equipped (they now receive a visual only check of emissions control devices). All OBD II vehicles in those areas (1996 model year or newer, 1997 and newer for diesel) require and OBD II test plus a visual check of emissions components.  Any vehicle 26 model years old or more does not require an emissions check of any sort, and vehicles 2 model years old or newer are exempt.  Diesel trucks over 8500 lbs. GVWR are required to have a diesel emissions inspection if they are registered in the NYC metropolitan area.
 North Carolina – annually, required for vehicles in 22 (out of 100) counties, for vehicles newer than 20 years old.  Effective November 1, 2008, no inspection decal is issued upon passing. All state inspection records both emissions and safety are now kept via electronic database, and are required for being awarded new license plates, and/or registration. Effective April 1, 2015, vehicles that are within the last three model years (including the current model year) and have fewer than 70,000 miles on the odometer are exempt from emissions inspection.
 Ohio – currently required only in the Cleveland metropolitan area (Cuyahoga County, Geauga County, Lake County, Lorain County, Medina County, Portage County, and Summit County).  Vehicles up to four years old are exempt. Testing is based on an odd-even year system. Cars purchased in 2000 were not required to be tested until 2010, while cars purchased in 2003 had to be tested in 2009. Ohio does not charge a fee for emission testing, due to Ohio's tobacco settlement.
 Oregon – required only (1975 and newer) in the Portland and Medford metro areas
 Pennsylvania – annually for most vehicles under  GVW.  Required in 25 (out of 67) counties.  Diesel-powered vehicles are exempt from emissions inspection.
 Rhode Island – biennially.
 Texas – annually, required only in four of the state's six largest urban areas: Houston, Dallas–Fort Worth, Austin, and El Paso (not San Antonio, ranked third, and Hidalgo County in the Rio Grande Valley, ranked fifth). Vehicles more than 2 model years old and up to 24 model years old are subjected to the annual emission tests (pre-OBDII automobiles registered in the Houston Metro area and DFW Metroplex are tested using the accelerated simulation mode while four-wheel drive/all wheel drive automobiles, light trucks, vans, and SUVs over 8500GVW, continue to use the two-speed idle test (Travis/Williamson and El Paso Counties use the TSI test for pre-1996) – anything over 25 model years old – including those registered as an antique or classic, are exempted from emission testing. Motorcycles and diesel vehicles are exempt from any state emissions testing.
 Utah – All vehicles registered in Davis, Salt Lake, Utah and Weber counties with model years less than six years old are required to have an emission test once every two years and Vehicles with model years six years old and older (to 1967) must have an emission test every year. Emission certificates are not required for vehicles with model years 1967 or older. All vehicles registered in Cache County with model years six years old and greater that have even-numbered model years, must have an emission test in even number years, and vehicles with odd-numbered model years must have an emission test in odd-numbered years. Vehicles with model years 1968 or older do not require an emission test.
 Vermont – annually, done at time of State Inspection 1996 and new with OBDII, some cars are exempt
 Virginia – biennially, in conjunction with registration renewal, required only in urban and suburban jurisdictions in Northern Virginia.  Newly registered vehicles with a valid inspection from another state are NOT exempt from inspection until the out-of-state inspection expires.  A vehicle registered in Virginia must have a Virginia safety inspection.
 Wisconsin – biennially, required only in Kenosha County, Milwaukee County, Ozaukee County, Racine County, Sheboygan County, Washington County, and Waukesha County.  Vehicles manufactured before 1996 are exempt from testing.

Require VIN inspection 
 California – Required when registering an out-of-state vehicle
 Colorado – Required when registering an out-of-state vehicle
 Connecticut – Required when registering an out-of-state vehicle
 Florida – Required when registering an out-of-state vehicle
 Idaho – Required when registering an out-of-state vehicle
 Illinois – The main VIN tag is inspected at emissions testing stations.  If the VIN tag is not acceptable or is missing, the vehicle is "rejected" for emissions testing. Emissions testing is required biennially only for vehicles registered in specific counties and zip codes (see above).
 Indiana – required when registering an out of state vehicle
 Kansas – Required when registering an out-of-state vehicle
 Kentucky – Required when registering an out-of-state vehicle
 Maine – Required to match VIN with registration as part of the annual safety inspection. A tracing verification of the VIN is not part of the inspection.
 Missouri – Required when registering an out-of-state vehicle
Nebraska – Required when registering an out-of-state, rebuilt, or salvage title vehicle
 Nevada – Required when registering an out-of-state vehicle for the first time in the state 
 New Mexico – Required when registering an out-of-state vehicle
 Ohio – Required when registering an out-of-state vehicle
 Oklahoma – Required when registering an out-of-state vehicle
 Oregon – Required when registering an out-of-state or new-to-Oregon vehicle.
 Pennsylvania – Required as part of the annual safety inspection.  The inspection procedure only requires checking the main VIN tag. A tracing or visual verification of the VIN by an inspection mechanic or notary is also required when registering an out-of-state vehicle.
 Rhode Island – Required when registering an out-of-state vehicle
 Tennessee - Required when registering vehicles with salvage titles that have been declared rebuilt.
 Texas – Required when registering an out-of-state vehicle; however, the VIN is inspected as part of the required safety inspection, so no additional effort is required.
 Utah - Required when registering an out-of-state vehicle
 Vermont – Required when registering out-of-state vehicle
 Washington – Required only when registering an out-of-state vehicle for the first time in the state, or for rebuilt vehicles
 Wyoming – Required when registering an out-of-state vehicle

No safety, emissions, or VIN inspections 
 Alaska
 Arkansas
 Iowa
 Michigan
 Minnesota
 Mississippi
 Montana
 North Dakota
 South Carolina
 South Dakota
 Washington
 Wyoming

Non-commercial vehicles

See also 
 Vehicle inspection
 Under vehicle inspection
 Automobile safety

References 
Car Inspection Requirements By State

External links
 CITA-Vehicle Inspection.org

Automotive safety
Road transport
Car costs
United States